María Fernández Almenar (born 1 February 1985) is a Spanish retired football midfielder.

Career

Having initially joined as a 13 year old, Fernández played for Levante in Spain's Primera División between 2005 and 2011, winning the league in 2008. In 2011, she announced her retirement from the sport to take up a career as a teacher. She cited the low salary in women's football in Spain as a reason for retiring.

Titles
 1 Spanish league: 2008
 2 Spanish cups: 2005, 2007

References

1985 births
Living people
Spanish women's footballers
Primera División (women) players
Levante UD Femenino players
Women's association football fullbacks
Footballers from Valencia (city)